Allomarkgrafia is a genus of flowering plants in the family Apocynaceae, first described as a genus in 1932. It is native to Central America and northwestern South America.

Species
 Allomarkgrafia brenesiana Woodson - Costa Rica, Panama
 Allomarkgrafia campanulata (Markgr. ex A.H.Gentry) J.F.Morales - Panama
 Allomarkgrafia ecuatoriana J.F. Morales - Colombia, Ecuador
 Allomarkgrafia foreroi A.H.Gentry - Colombia, Ecuador
 Allomarkgrafia insignis J.F.Morales - Costa Rica
 Allomarkgrafia laxiflora A.H.Gentry - Colombia, Ecuador
 Allomarkgrafia ovalis (Ruiz & Pav. ex Markgr.) Woodson - Peru
 Allomarkgrafia plumeriiflora Woodson - Costa Rica, Panama, Nicaragua, Honduras, Colombia
 Allomarkgrafia tubiflora Woodson ex Dwyer - Peru

References

 
Apocynaceae genera
Taxonomy articles created by Polbot